Stuart Cradock (born 14 September 1949) was an English cricketer. A right-handed batsman and right-arm medium-fast bowler, he played for Hertfordshire. He was born in Hertford.

Cradock, who represented Hertfordshire in the Minor Counties Championship between 1973 and 1980, made a single List A appearance for the team, during the 1976 season. From the tailend, Cradock scored three not out with the bat, and conceded 35 runs from 12 overs with the ball.

External links
Stuart Cradock at Cricket Archive

1949 births
Living people
English cricketers of 1969 to 2000
Hertfordshire cricketers
People from Hertford